Popiel II was a legendary 9th century ruler of the West Slavic tribe of Goplans.

Popiel may also refer to:
 Popiel I, legendary ruler of Poland, father of Popiel II
 Popiel (surname)
 Popiel, Lublin Voivodeship, village in Poland
 Papilys, town in Lithuania known as Popiel in Polish

See also
 
 Popeil